Wally Lorenz is a Canadian former politician who served in the Legislative Assembly of Saskatchewan in 2003, as a Saskatchewan Party member for the constituency of Battleford-Cut Knife.

Lorenz holds the distinction of having the shortest term as an MLA, as he only served six months in the position. Due to redistribution, Lorenz lost the nomination in the new electoral district of Cut Knife-Turtleford to Michael Chisholm.

References

Saskatchewan Party MLAs
Year of birth missing (living people)
Living people